Cacodaphnella is a monotypic genus of very small predatory sea snails, marine gastropod mollusks in the family Mangeliidae.

Species
Species within the genus Cacodaphnella include:
 Cacodaphnella delgada Pilsbry & Lowe, 1932

References

 H. A. Pilsbry and H. N. Lowe, West Mexican and Central American Mollusks Collected by H. N. Lowe, 1929-31; Proceedings of the Academy of Natural Sciences of Philadelphia Vol. 84 (1932), pp. 33-144
 Bouchet, P.; Kantor, Y. I.; Sysoev, A.; Puillandre, N. (2011). A new operational classification of the Conoidea. Journal of Molluscan Studies. 77, 273-308

External links
  Tucker, J.K. 2004 Catalog of recent and fossil turrids (Mollusca: Gastropoda). Zootaxa 682:1-1295.
 Worldwide Mollusc Species Data Base: Mangeliidae

 
Gastropod genera